The term González government may refer to:

González I Government, the government of Spain under Felipe González from 1982 to 1986.
González II Government, the government of Spain under Felipe González from 1986 to 1989.
González III Government, the government of Spain under Felipe González from 1989 to 1993.
González IV Government, the government of Spain under Felipe González from 1993 to 1996.